Pleasant Hill is an unincorporated community in Jackson Parish, Louisiana, United States.

References

Populated places in Ark-La-Tex
Ruston, Louisiana micropolitan area
Unincorporated communities in Jackson Parish, Louisiana
Unincorporated communities in Louisiana